The Nile Basin is the part of Africa drained by the Nile River and its tributaries.

Besides being the second largest hydrographic basin in Africa, the Nile Basin is effectively the most notable drainage basin on the continent. It covers approximately 2,870,000 km2, or about 10% of African territory, crossing arid regions and with a high population density. The Nile Basin Initiative (NBI) has been in existence since 1999, with the aim of strengthening cooperation in sharing its resources concerned.

The drainage area of the basin covers Burundi, the Central African Republic, Chad, the Democratic Republic of the Congo, Egypt, Eritrea, Ethiopia, Kenya, Rwanda, South Sudan, the Sudan, Tanzania, and Uganda. The Basin is the main supplier of fresh water, electricity, and fish for the local residents of these countries, supporting about 270 million inhabitants, or 20% of the African population. The basin rises in the highlands and flows in extremely arid regions, in particular the Sahara Desert.

Its main navigable course is through the Nile River, being the mouth section in the Mediterranean Sea (more precisely after the Nile Delta) until it surrounds the city of Aswan, in southern Egypt. There are also navigable courses at the Aswan Dam. In the middle Nile, after the dam, due to the presence of waterfalls north of Khartoum (Sudan), the river is navigable in just three stretches. The first is from the Egypt–Sudan border to the southern tip of Lake Nasser. The second is the section between the third and fourth cataracts. The third and most important stretch extends from Khartoum, in the south, to Juba (South Sudan).

The main water supplier for the basin is Lake Victoria, located in the Great Rift Valley. About 238 million people live within the Nile basin, 172 million of those inhabit rural localities.

In the southwestern part of the  basin in South Sudan near the watershed with Congo Basin relief is made up a single large pediplain. Heights that rise above this pediplain contain laterite soils, sometimes with pisolites or ferricrete, and are remnants of an older surface. The some of the summits corresponding to the said old surface were formed by relief inversion of valleys.

References 

Basin, Nile
Basins of Africa
Drainage basins of Africa
African drainage basins of the Mediterranean Sea
Geography of Egypt
Geography of South Sudan
Geography of Sudan
B